Orpheus is a tabletop role playing game by White Wolf Publishing, set in a microcosm of the World of Darkness. Unlike the other World of Darkness game lines, Orpheus has a specifically planned metaplot and a set number of books that were published. Although it uses the same system as White Wolf's other games, ghosts and spirits are the exclusive focus of this story. Other supernatural creatures in the World of Darkness are strongly discouraged from entering the events of Orpheus. It is, however, tied with Wraith: The Oblivion, White Wolf's previous game dealing with the afterlife; some of the events in Orpheus are related to Ends of Empire, the final book in the Wraith: The Oblivion line.

Volumes
There are six books in total in the Orpheus line; the first is the main rulebook, which holds the rules used throughout the series. The five that follow carry out a specific, albeit optional, plotline, told through fiction and roleplaying, as well as expanding on the roleplaying tools presented in the first game. They are, in chronological order:
{| class="wikitable sortable"
! Title !!White WolfProduct Number!! ISBN
|-
| Orpheus || style="text-align:center;" | WW21000 || style="text-align:center;" | 
|- 
| Crusade of Ashes || style="text-align:center;" | WW21001 || style="text-align:center;" | 
|-
| Shades of Gray || style="text-align:center;" | WW21010 || style="text-align:center;" | 
|-
| Shadow Games || style="text-align:center;" | WW21011 || style="text-align:center;" | 
|-
| Orphan-Grinders || style="text-align:center;" | WW21012 || style="text-align:center;" | 
|-
| End Game || style="text-align:center;" | WW21015 || style="text-align:center;" | 
|}
Orpheus is noteworthy in that it began the trend of White Wolf creating game series with limited numbers of supplements. This concept continued on with the Chronicles of Darkness games Promethean: The Created, Changeling: The Lost, Hunter: The Vigil, and Geist: The Sin-Eaters, all of which were initially planned as limited releases.

There also was an anthology based on Orpheus named Orpheus: Haunting the Dead (WW11905 / ).

Character types
Characters in Orpheus are either living individuals capable of astral projection (via meditation or cryonics) or are ghosts of the recently deceased. It is assumed that characters work for the Orpheus Group, a company that employs the talents of projectors and spirits to investigate and clear ghostly activity and perform other tasks difficult for those without access to the world of the dead. The way a person manifests as a ghost is called the Lament; two Laments are projection-based, while two are based on a person being dead.

 Skimmers use drugs and meditative techniques to temporarily eject their souls from their bodies. While they can enter and exit the spirit world quickly, their close connection to their empty shells means damage they take as a ghost manifests on their bodies.
 Sleepers are cryonically frozen; once the body reaches a certain temperature, it is "dead" and ejects the spirit. While in stasis, the body is treated with special drugs to keep necrosis from setting in. While it keeps sleepers from the close connections skimmers have that allows them to be injured, the process means that both entering and leaving the world of ghosts is a slow process.
 Spirits are your run-of-the-mill dead person, souls who have unfinished businesses that allow them to remain on earth. Most who work for Orpheus have a high degree of independence because of a remarkable willpower they held in life that transitions to death; not all spirits, however, are able to keep their independent attitudes when they die and become doomed to repeat themselves endlessly.
 Hues are spirits with one major difference; while alive, they took the designer drug pigment. Pigment keeps a spirit from feeling ultimately fulfilled, so while a hue may be as stubborn as a spirit, they have more fragile forms and are closer to their dark sides.

Each character has a set of special traits, called a Shade, which determine how they manifest and what ghostly powers (or Horrors) they are able to use and which ones they cannot. There are eight Shades in total; the first five were introduced in the Orpheus corebook, while the remaining three were introduced in three of the supplements.

 Banshees are the empathetic shades, full of compassion. They manifest their abilities of emotional manipulation, physical damage, and looking into the future through their voices.
 Haunters are those who care for things over people. This focus allows them to manipulate inanimate objects and machines to a disturbing degree.
 Poltergeists are usually full of rage, either quiet or overt. This allows them to pick up objects without touching them directly, and also to alter their own forms in violent ways.
 Skinriders are control freaks. They are granted the ability to possess the bodies of others and bend them to their will.
 Wisps are the trickster shade. They have abilities that allow them to draw attention, escape in a flash, or manipulate ghostly items.
 Phantasms, introduced in Shades of Gray, are the artists and dreamers. They can see and manipulate the dreams of the living.
 Orphan-Grinders, introduced in The Orphan-Grinders, are ghosts who gave in to their dark sides, and then came back. They can use the abilities of the dark ghosts, or Spectres.
 Marrow, introduced in End Game, can adapt to any situation. Appropriately, they are shapeshifters and also have a rapport with animals.

Antagonists
Along with ghosts as antagonists, there are also rival projection companies, such as Terrel and Squib, and a new designer drug called pigment or black heroin that allows users to see the spirits of the dead. There are also dark spirits called Spectres, some of which are corrupted spirits and hues, and others that have spawned from an unknown but powerful source. These create much of the storyline and challenges the players must face as they move through the series.

External links
 Orpheus in The official World of Darkness wiki
 Interview with Lucien Soulban (Orpheus Developer)

World of Darkness
Role-playing games introduced in 2003